Liam Kent (born 9 April 1991) is a rugby league footballer for Featherstone Rovers. He previously played for Hull F.C. in the Super League.

References

1991 births
Living people
English rugby league players
Featherstone Rovers players
Hull F.C. players
Rugby league second-rows
Rugby league players from Kingston upon Hull